The London, Midland and Scottish Railway (LMS) Sentinel No. 7164, (later 7184 and under British Railways, 47184) was a small shunting locomotive. Its design was that of the single-speed Sentinel, a vertical-boilered geared locomotive, using Sentinel's standard vertical boiler and steam motor design. This was the smallest of the four Sentinel classes used by the LMS.

Design 
7164 was the LMS' only example of the early Sentinel BE or 'Balanced Engine' design, rather than the later CE or 'Central Engine' design used for 7160-7163. This placed the boiler and engine at opposite ends of the frames, with the water tank in the centre. Although the LNER Class Y1 Sentinel was also a single-speed, they were of the larger Central Engine design and were similar to the two-speed locomotives in appearance.

Service 
Built in 1931 by Sentinel Waggon Works as Works No. 8593, it was taken into LMS stock in 1932 as 7164.  It was to a design that was also built for use industry, but unique within the LMS, though the LMS did have other Sentinels of different types. The LMS gave it the power classification 0F.  It was renumbered 7184 in 1939 and as 47184 after nationalisation in 1948. 47184 was withdrawn in 1955 from 5B Crewe Works and subsequently scrapped.

Other LMS Sentinel classes 
 7160-7163, two-speed Sentinels
 7164
 7190–7191, the S&DJR 'Radstock' Sentinels
 7192, the Abner Doble-designed four-cylinder compound

Preservation 

47184 was not preserved. However, a similar locomotive that worked in industry, works No. 7232 Ann was in 2003 painted to masquerade as 7164 on the Embsay and Bolton Abbey Steam Railway.  The prototype only carried unlined black livery but Ann was given lined black livery and retained her nameplate.

References 

 
 
 
 

0F
Sentinel locomotives
Individual locomotives of Great Britain
0-4-0T locomotives
Standard gauge steam locomotives of Great Britain
Railway locomotives introduced in 1931
Scrapped locomotives
Shunting locomotives